Gravelly Shoals Light is an automated lighthouse that is an active aid to navigation on the shallow shoals extending southeast from Point Lookout on the western side of Saginaw Bay. Architecturally this is considered to be Art Deco style.

History
As part of President Roosevelt's New Deal and its program to "Put America Back to Work" the new light tower was put up for bid, and built in 1939.  It replaced an earlier gas-lit buoy.  It also displaced the Charity Island Light, which was constructed in 1857, and operated until 1930.

Contemporary unmanned lights in the Art Deco style are the Indiana Harbor East Breakwater Light and its twin, the better known Port Washington Breakwater Light in Wisconsin.

When built according to its original specifications, the contractor warned that the foundation was inadequate to withstand the buildup of ice, and put in a bid for a contract modification.  However, at the time jurisdiction over the light had just been transferred to the Coast Guard from the United States Lighthouse Service, and they chose to disregard the warning, and to accept the light as built.  This resulted in substantial additional expense in due course, as the light had to be retrofitted.

This light is designed as an autonomous automated electrified station. It is under the control and maintenance of Coast Guard Station in Tawas City, Michigan. Ordinarily it displays a 15,000 candela  light powered by a 120 volt electric lamp. Power is supplied through a submarine cable, which crosses the shoal from Point Lookout. It is supplemented by a standby 110 candela acetylene light with a half second flash every three seconds—which activates automatically if there is a power failure. In foggy weather, mariners are warned by twin compressed-air two-tone #3 diaphones, which operate on a 30-second cycle (3-second blast followed by 27 seconds of silence).

The National Weather Service operates an automated weather observing station at the lighthouse.

An added large steel tower atop the light is a radio beacon.  The 1953 Coast Guard Light List indicates that the signal transmitted at 296 kHz, send forth a group of half-second dashes for 15.5 seconds, followed by 14½ seconds of silence. As of 2001, both the light and radio beacon served as active navigational aids.

Although it never had a resident lighthouse keeper, this light is a recognized 'significant light" by the National Park Service National Maritime Initiative.

As of July, 2015, the light is for sale through an on line GSA auction process.

Getting there
Tours of Charity Island (and even dinner cruises) are available, which can include the privately owned, rebuilt Charity Island Light lightkeeper's house. They are available from Charity Island Transport, Inc. in Au Gres, Michigan on the mainland, south of Tawas.

It is also possible to take a telephoto shot from shore.

 US 23 north from Au Gres,  to Point Lookout Road.  Turn right to its end; turn left onto Michigan Ave. Through a break in the houses one can see Saginaw Bay and the light.

See also
Lighthouses in the United States

Notes

Further reading

 Bibliography on Michigan lighthouses.
 Detroit News Interactive map on Michigan lighthouses. 
 Great Lakes Light Keepers Association.
Great Lakes Lighthouse Resources, Great Lakes Light Keepers Association.
 Harrison, Tim (editor of Lighthouse Digest and President of the American Lighthouse Foundation), (September, 2009) Ghost Lights of Michigan (Rare historic images and text on Michigan's lost and obscure lighthouse, including bonus chapters on lightships and lighthouse tenders.) East Machias, Maine: Foghorn Publishing, .
 Hyde, Charles K., and Ann and John Mahan. The Northern Lights: Lighthouses of the Upper Great Lakes.  Detroit: Wayne State University Press, 1995.   .
 Map of Michigan Lighthouse in PDF Format.
 Michigan Light List. Michigan Lighthouse Conservancy.
 Map of Michigan Lighthouses. Michigan Lighthouse Fund.
 Michigan Lighthouse Conservancy.
 Oleszewski, Wes, Great Lakes Lighthouses, American and Canadian: A Comprehensive Directory/Guide to Great Lakes Lighthouses, (Gwinn, Michigan: Avery Color Studios, Inc., 1998) .
 Penrod, John. Lighthouses of Michigan, (Berrien Center, Michigan: Penrod/Hiawatha, 1998)  .
 Penrose, Laurie and Penrose, Bill Traveler's Guide to 116 Michigan Lighthouses,  Petoskey, Michigan: Friede Publications, 1999.  .
 Pepper, Terry, President Great Lakes Lightkeepers Association, Seeing the Light: Lighthouses on the western Great Lakes
 Roach, Jerry. Lighthouse Central, Michigan Lighthouses.
The Ultimate Guide to East Michigan Lighthouses. Bugs Publishing, 2006. ; .
The Ultimate Guide to Upper Michigan Lighthouses. Bugs Publishing, 2007. .
The Ultimate Guide to West Michigan Lighthouses. Bugs Publishing, 2005. .
 Sapulski, Wayne S., (2001) Lighthouses of Lake Michigan: Past and Present (Paperback) (Fowlerville: Wilderness Adventure Books) ; .
 Splake, T. Kilgore. Superior Land Lights. Battle Creek, MI: Angst Productions, 1984.
 
 Wagner, John L. "Beacons Shining in the Night: The Lighthouses of Michigan". Clarke Historical Library, Central Michigan University.
 Wagner, John L., Michigan Lighthouses: An Aerial Photographic Perspective, (East Lansing, Michigan: John L. Wagner, 1998)  .
 Wargin, Ed, Legends of Light: A Michigan Lighthouse Portfolio. Ann Arbor Media Group, 2006. .
 Wobser, David,  Lighthouses of the Great Lakes, boatnerd.com.
 Wright, Larry and Wright, Patricia, Great Lakes Lighthouses Encyclopedia Boston Mills Press, 2006. .

External links
 
Interactive map of lighthouses in area by LighthousesRus
Map of Michigan Lighthouses from Michigan.gov
Michigan lighthouse conservancy, Gravelly Shoal Light
National Buoy Data Center with automatic readout of wind, waves and weather for Gravelly Shoal Light.
Photograph of Coast Guard boat at Gravelly Shoal, circa 1942, Archives of Michigan.
Photos of Gravelly Shoal Light (current) from ferry

Lighthouses in Michigan
Art Deco architecture in Michigan
Buildings and structures in Arenac County, Michigan
Transportation in Arenac County, Michigan
Saginaw Bay